Route 101, also known as Long Harbour Access Road, is a  north–south highway located on the Avalon Peninsula in the Canadian province of Newfoundland and Labrador.  It is an access road to Long Harbour, with its southern terminus being an intersection at Route 100, near the town of Dunville, and its northern terminus is an intersection at Route 202, near Long Harbour.  This highway is used frequently by employees who work at the Vale Nickel Processing Plant in Long Harbour.

Major intersections

References

101